Aleksandr Igorevich Marenich (born 29 April 1989) is a former Russian professional footballer.

Club career
He made his professional debut in the Russian Football Premier League in 2006 for FC Rostov.

Career statistics

International career
Marenich was one of the members of the Russian U-17 squad that won the 2006 UEFA U-17 Championship.

External links

References

1989 births
Living people
Russian footballers
Russia youth international footballers
Russia under-21 international footballers
FC Rostov players
FC Moscow players
FC Spartak Vladikavkaz players
Russian Premier League players
FC SKA Rostov-on-Don players
FC Lokomotiv Moscow players
Association football wingers
Association football forwards
FC Ural Yekaterinburg players
FC Avangard Kursk players
FC Spartak-2 Moscow players